Okrajnik is a village in Gmina Bolków, Jawor County, Lower Silesian Voivodeship, in south-western Poland.

From 1975 to 1998 the village was in Jelenia Góra Voivodeship.

References

Map of the Gmina Bolków

Okrajnik